Martes is the genus within the family Mustelidae that comprises martens. It may also refer to:

5026 Martes, a main-belt asteroid discovered in 1987
Spanish for Tuesday
Martes Santo; see Holy Tuesday

See also
Marte (disambiguation)
Marts (disambiguation)
Mart (disambiguation)